Jeff Smith (born May 28, 1962) is a former American football wide receiver who played six seasons in the Canadian Football League with the Toronto Argonauts, Winnipeg Blue Bombers and Ottawa Rough Riders. He played college football at California Polytechnic State University. He was also a member of the Orlando Renegades of the United States Football League.

References

External links
Just Sports Stats

Living people
1962 births
Players of American football from California
Sportspeople from San Diego County, California
American football wide receivers
Canadian football wide receivers
American players of Canadian football
Cal Poly Mustangs football players
Toronto Argonauts players
Washington Federals/Orlando Renegades players
Winnipeg Blue Bombers players
Ottawa Rough Riders players
People from Poway, California